Andrew Barry McDonald (born 5 June 1981) is the head Australian cricket coach and former cricketer who played for the Victoria and South Australia cricket teams. He was born in Wodonga, Victoria and currently lives in Geelong, Victoria.

He made his Test match debut in Sydney on 3 January 2009, against South Africa. McDonald also represented Australia at under 19 level and has played for the Prime Minister's XI. He is an allrounder who bats right-handed and is a right-arm medium-fast bowler. McDonald was captain of the Australian A XI which took on South Africa in October/November 2012.

Coaching career 
After retiring as a player, he became a cricket coach. He has coached Leicestershire County Cricket Club, Victoria and the Melbourne Renegades. He won the Sheffield Shield in his first year as senior coach of Victoria.

He was also bowling coach for Royal Challengers Bangalore and head coach of Rajasthan Royals in the Indian Premier League.

In October 2019, he was appointed as assistant coach to Justin Langer with the Australian men's cricket team.

On 5 February 2022, with the resignation of Justin Langer, McDonald was appointed interim head coach of the team.

On 13 April 2022, he was appointed as head coach for Australia national cricket team for four years.

Career summary
McDonald started his first class career with 32 wickets in his first ten games in 2003–04. His best spell was 6 for 67 against Western Australia. He was struggling however with the bat and despite batting at 4 at the start of the summer he would end it at number 8 in the batting order. Finger surgery the following season limited his appearances. In 2005–06 he played just four matches and only managed 83 runs and four wickets. Injury-free, McDonald came into his own in the 2006–07 season. In the Pura Cup he boasted a batting average of over a hundred when he brought up his 500th run. He finished the season as only the 4th player in Sheffield Shield/Pura Cup history to reach the double of 750 runs and 25 wickets in a season.

He was rewarded for his strong domestic form by being named in the Australian 30-man preliminary squad for the 2007 World Cup. He was also named in the Australian preliminary squads for the 2007 ICC World Twenty20 and a 7 match ODI series tour of India.

He made his Test debut in the Third Test against South Africa at the Sydney Cricket Ground in January, 2009 because Andrew Symonds and Shane Watson were both injured. In Australia's first innings, McDonald came in at number six and scored 15 before edging a catch to Mark Boucher. During this innings, he was given a nasty bouncer by Morné Morkel, knocking his helmet off from behind and narrowly missing his leg-stump. The next day, he removed Hashim Amla (lbw) for 51 to claim his first ever Test wicket.

He was subsequently selected for the tour to South Africa in February–March 2009. In a three match Test series which Australia won 2–1, McDonald made some valuable contributions, including 68 in the second innings of the Third Test at Cape Town and taking 6 wickets during the series. As a result of his performance, McDonald was selected for the 2009 Ashes tour, although did not play in any of the Tests.  He did score 75 runs opening the batting in the second innings against Northamptonshire, as well as taking 4 for 15 to win the match for Australia. He returned to Australia temporarily from the 2009 Ashes tour to be with his wife who was due to give birth to the couple's first child.

In the 2009 Indian Premier League McDonald played for the Delhi Daredevils, and his experience in India playing for Victoria in the Champions League Twenty20 was a factor in his call-up to Australia's injury-hit ODI squad in India in November 2009.

McDonald was one of the 350 players under the hammer for the IPL Auction 2011. He was bought by Delhi Daredevils for US$80,000. On 11 January 2012 during the first transfer window trading, Royal Challengers Bangalore signed him from Delhi for a transfer fee of US$100,000.

Notes

External links
 

1981 births
Living people
Victoria cricketers
Australia Test cricketers
Melbourne Cricket Club cricketers
Australian cricketers
Leicestershire cricketers
Leicestershire cricket captains
Delhi Capitals cricketers
Royal Challengers Bangalore cricketers
Melbourne Renegades cricketers
South Australia cricketers
Cricketers from Victoria (Australia)
Sydney Thunder cricketers
Uva Next cricketers
Australian cricket coaches
People from Wodonga
Big Bash League coaches
Melbourne Renegades coaches
Coaches of the Australia national cricket team